The "Druid's Prayer" or "Gorsedd Prayer" (Gweddi'r Orsedd) is a prayer composed by Iolo Morganwg which is still a staple in the ritual of both gorseddau and Neo-Druidism. Neo-Druids sometimes substitute the words y Dduwies ("the Goddess") for the original Duw ("God").

Versions in Barddas
In the volume Barddas by Iolo Morganwg (edited and compiled by Reverend John Williams ab Ithel), there are six versions of the Gorsedd Prayer, both in Iolo's original Welsh and in English translation (the word gwynvyd, roughly corresponding to "heaven" is left untranslated).

Version One

Llyma Weddi'r Orsedd, a elwir Gweddi'r Gwyddoniaid (O Lyfr Mawr Margam)
Duw dy nerth, ag yn nerth Dioddef;
A dioddef dros y gwir, ag yn y gwir pob goleuni;
Ag yngoleuni pob Gwynfyd, ag yngwynfyd Cariad,
Ag ynghariad Duw, ag yn Duw pob daioni.

The Gorsedd Prayer, called the Prayer of the Gwyddoniaid (From the Great Book of Margam)
God, impart Thy strength;
And in strength, power to suffer;
And to suffer for the truth;
And in the truth, all light;
And in light, gwynvyd;
And in gwynfyd, love;
And in love, God;
And in God, all goodness.

Version Two

Llyma weddi'r Orsedd o Lyfr Trehaearn Brydydd Mawr
Dyro Dduw dy Nawdd;
Ag yn Nawdd, Pwyll;
Ag ymhwyll, Goleuni;
Ag yngoleuni, Gwirionedd;
Ag yngwirionedd, Cyfiawnder;
Ag ynghyfiawnder, Cariad;
Ag ynghariad, Cariad Duw;
Ag ynghariad Duw, pob Gwynfyd.
Duw a phob Daioni.

The Gorsedd Prayer, from the Book of Trahaiarn the Great Poet
Grant, God, Thy protection;
And in protection, reason;
And in reason, light;
And in light, truth;
And in truth, justice;
And in justice, love;
And in love, the love of God;
And in the love of God, gwynfyd.
God and all goodness.

Version Three
The below version is that usually adopted by various druidic groups, notably the Order of Bards, Ovates and Druids (OBOD) albeit in a different fashion.

Llyma weddi'r orsedd o Lyfr arall
Dyro Dduw dy Nawdd;
Ag yn nawdd, nerth;
Ag yn nerth, Deall;
Ag yn Neall, Gwybod;
Ac yngwybod, gwybod y cyfiawn;
Ag yngwybod yn cyfiawn, ei garu;
Ag o garu, caru pob hanfod;
Ag ymhob Hanfod, caru Duw.
Duw a phob Daioni.

The Gorsedd Prayer, from another Book
Grant, O God, Thy protection;
And in protection, strength;
And in strength, understanding;
And in understanding, knowledge;
And in knowledge, the knowledge of justice;
And in the knowledge of justice, the love of it;
And in that love, the love of all existences;
And in the love of all existences, the love of God.
God and all goodness.

Notes

References 
Williams ab Ithel, Rev. John ed.: Barddas; or, a Collection of Original Documents, Illustrative of the Theology, Wisdom, and Usages of the Bardo-Druidic System of the Isle of Britain: Longman & Co. (1862)

Eisteddfod
Neo-druidism
Prayer
Welsh-language literature

:cy:Wikisource:Gweddi'r Orsedd